Gilbert Lewis is the name of:
 Gilbert Lewis (actor) (1941–2015), American actor
 Gilbert N. Lewis (1875–1946), American chemist
Sir Gilbert Lewis, 3rd Baronet of the Lewis baronets
Gilbert Lewis (anthropologist), see 1980s in sociology

See also
Lewis Gilbert (disambiguation)